This is a list of ASTM international standards with ID in the range D5001–6000.

List

D5001–D5100
D5001 – 19e1 Test Method for Measurement of Lubricity of Aviation Turbine Fuels by the Ball-on-Cylinder Lubricity Evaluator (BOCLE)
D5002 – 19 Test Method for Density, Relative Density, and API Gravity of Crude Oils by Digital Density Analyzer
D5003 – 19 Test Method for Hardgrove Grindability Index (HGI) of Petroleum Coke
D5004 – 11(2017) Test Method for Real Density of Calcined Petroleum Coke by Xylene Displacement
D5006 – 11(2016) Test Method for Measurement of Fuel System Icing Inhibitors (Ether Type) in Aviation Fuels
D5007 – 99(2017) Test Method for Wet-to-Dry Hiding Change
D5008 – 07(2012) Test Method for Ethyl Methyl Pentanol Content and Purity Value of 2-Ethylhexanol By Gas Chromatography
D5009 – 02(2017) Test Method for Evaluating and Comparing Transfer Efficiency of Spray Applied Coatings Under Laboratory Conditions
D5011 – 17 Practices for Calibration of Ozone Monitors Using Transfer Standards
D5012 – 20 Practice for Preparation of Materials Used for the Collection and Preservation of Atmospheric Wet Deposition
D5013 – 18 Practices for Sampling Wastes from Pipes and Other Point Discharges
D5015 – 15 Test Method for pH of Atmospheric Wet Deposition Samples by Electrometric Determination
D5016 – 16 Test Method for Total Sulfur in Coal and Coke Combustion Residues Using a High-Temperature Tube Furnace Combustion Method with Infrared Absorption
D5017 – 17 Test Method for Determination of Linear Low Density Polyethylene (LLDPE) Composition by Carbon-13 Nuclear Magnetic Resonance
D5018 – 18 Test Method for Shear Viscosity of Coal-Tar and Petroleum Pitches
D5023 – 15 Test Method for Plastics: Dynamic Mechanical Properties: In Flexure (Three-Point Bending)
D5024 – 15 Test Method for Plastics: Dynamic Mechanical Properties: In Compression
D5025 – 20a Specification for Laboratory Burner Used for Small-Scale Burning Tests on Plastic Materials
D5026 – 15 Test Method for Plastics: Dynamic Mechanical Properties: In Tension
D5028 – 17 Test Method for Curing Properties of Pultrusion Resins by Thermal Analysis
D5029 – 98(2020) Test Method for Water Solubles in Activated Carbon
D5030/D5030M – 13a Test Methods for Density of Soil and Rock in Place by the Water Replacement Method in a Test Pit
D5031/D5031M – 13(2018) Practice for Enclosed Carbon-Arc Exposure Tests of Paint and Related Coatings
D5032 – 19 Practice for Maintaining Constant Relative Humidity by Means of Aqueous Glycerin Solutions
D5034 – 09(2017) Test Method for Breaking Strength and Elongation of Textile Fabrics (Grab Test)
D5035 – 11(2019) Test Method for Breaking Force and Elongation of Textile Fabrics (Strip Method)
D5040 – 90(2016) Test Methods for Ash Content of Adhesives
D5041 – 98(2019) Test Method for Fracture Strength in Cleavage of Adhesives in Bonded Joints
D5044 – 06(2017) Test Method for Rubber Compounding Materials—Free 2-Mercaptobenzothiazole (MBT) in Benzothiazyl Disulfide (MBTS)
D5045 – 14 Test Methods for Plane-Strain Fracture Toughness and Strain Energy Release Rate of Plastic Materials
D5047 – 17 Specification for Polyethylene Terephthalate Film and Sheeting
D5048 – 20a Test Method for Measuring the Comparative Burning Characteristics and Resistance to Burn-Through of Solid Plastics Using a 125-mm Flame
D5050 – 08(2015) Guide for Commercial Use of Lime Kiln Dusts and Portland Cement Kiln Dusts
D5051 – 06(2017) Test Method for Rubber Compounding Materials—Benzothiazyl Disulfide (MBTS)—Assay
D5052 – 18 Test Method for Permeability of Leather to Water Vapor
D5053 – 03(2015) Test Method for Colorfastness of Crocking of Leather
D5055 – 19e1 Specification for Establishing and Monitoring Structural Capacities of Prefabricated Wood I-Joists
D5056 – 17 Test Method for Trace Metals in Petroleum Coke by Atomic Absorption
D5057 – 17 Test Method for Screening Apparent Specific Gravity and Bulk Density of Waste
D5058 – 12(2020) Practices for Compatibility of Screening Analysis of Waste
D5059 – 20 Test Methods for Lead and Manganese in Gasoline by X-Ray Spectroscopy
D5060 – 12 Test Method for Determining Impurities in High-Purity Ethylbenzene by Gas Chromatography
D5061 – 19 Test Method for Microscopical Determination of the Textural Components of Metallurgical Coke
D5062 – 09(2020) Test Method for Resin Solution Dilutability by Volumetric/Gravimetric Determination
D5063 – 90(2012) Guide for Use of Certification of Coating Conformance Form
D5064 – 16a Practice for Conducting a Patch Test to Assess Coating Compatibility
D5065 – 17 Guide for Assessing the Condition of Aged Coatings on Steel Surfaces
D5066 – 91(2017) Test Method for Determination of the Transfer Efficiency Under Production Conditions for Spray Application of Automotive Paints—Weight Basis
D5067 – 16 Specification for Artists' Watercolor Paints
D5068 – 04(2019) Practice for Preparation of Paint Brushes for Evaluation
D5069/D5069M – 13(2019) Practice for Preparation of Paint-Roller Covers for Evaluation of Architectural Coatings
D5070 – 90(2014) Test Method for Synthetic Quaternary Ammonium Salts in Fabric Softeners by Potentiometric Titrations
D5071 – 06(2013) Practice for Exposure of Photodegradable Plastics in a Xenon Arc Apparatus
D5072 – 09(2016) Test Method for Radon in Drinking Water
D5073 – 02(2013) Practice for Depth Measurement of Surface Water
D5074 – 90(2019)e1 Practice for Preparation of Natural-Matrix Sediment Reference Samples for Major and Trace Inorganic Constituents Analysis by Partial Extraction Procedures
D5075 – 01(2017)e1 Test Method for Nicotine and 3-Ethenylpyridine in Indoor Air
D5076/D5076M – 13(2019) Test Method for Measuring Voids in Roofing and Waterproofing Membranes
D5077 – 90(2015) Terminology Relating to Electrostatic Discharge (ESD) Packaging Materials
D5078/D5078M – 11(2016) Specification for Crack Filler, Hot-Applied, for Asphalt Concrete and Portland Cement Concrete Pavements
D5080 – 20 Test Method for Rapid Determination of Percent Compaction
D5081/D5081M – 90(2018) Test Method for Aggregate Layer Hiding Power
D5083 – 17 Test Method for Tensile Properties of Reinforced Thermosetting Plastics Using Straight-Sided Specimens
D5084 – 16a Test Methods for Measurement of Hydraulic Conductivity of Saturated Porous Materials Using a Flexible Wall Permeameter
D5085 – 02(2013) Test Method for Determination of Chloride, Nitrate, and Sulfate in Atmospheric Wet Deposition by Chemically Suppressed Ion Chromatography
D5086 – 20 Test Method for Determination of Calcium, Magnesium, Potassium, and Sodium in Atmospheric Wet Deposition by Flame Atomic Absorption Spectrophotometry
D5087 – 02(2014) Test Method for Determining Amount of Volatile Organic Compound (VOC) Released from Solventborne Automotive Coatings and Available for Removal in a VOC Control Device (Abatement)
D5088 – 20 Practice for Decontamination of Field Equipment Used at Waste Sites
D5089 – 95(2014) Test Method for Velocity Measurements of Water in Open Channels with Electromagnetic Current Meters
D5090 – 20 Practice for Standardizing Ultrafiltration Permeate Flow Performance Data
D5091 – 95(2014) Guide for Water Analysis for Electrodialysis/Electrodialysis Reversal Applications
D5092/D5092M – 16 Practice for Design and Installation of Groundwater Monitoring Wells
D5093 – 15e1 Test Method for Field Measurement of Infiltration Rate Using Double-Ring Infiltrometer with Sealed-Inner Ring
D5094/D5094M – 09(2014) Test Methods for Gross Leakage of Liquids from Containers with Threaded or Lug-Style Closures
D5095 – 91(2013) Test Method for Determination of the Nonvolatile Content in Silanes, Siloxanes and Silane-Siloxane Blends Used in Masonry Water Repellent Treatments
D5096 – 02(2017) Test Method for Determining the Performance of a Cup Anemometer or Propeller Anemometer
D5098 – 16 Specification for Artists' Acrylic Dispersion Paints
D5099 – 08(2017) Test Methods for Rubber—Measurement of Processing Properties Using Capillary Rheometry
D5100/D5100M – 95a(2018) Test Method for Adhesion of Mineral Aggregate to Hot Bitumen

D5101–D5200
D5101 – 12(2017) Test Method for Measuring the Filtration Compatibility of Soil-Geotextile Systems
D5103 – 07(2018) Test Method for Length and Length Distribution of Manufactured Staple Fibers (Single-Fiber Test)
D5105 – 05(2019) Practice for Performing Accelerated Outdoor Weathering of Pressure-Sensitive Tapes Using Concentrated Natural Sunlight
D5106 – 15 Specification for Steel Slag Aggregates for Bituminous Paving Mixtures
D5107 – 03(2013) Practice for Preparatory Surface Cleaning of Architectural Sandstone
D5110 – 98(2017) Practice for Calibration of Ozone Monitors and Certification of Ozone Transfer Standards Using Ultraviolet Photometry
D5111 – 12(2020) Guide for Choosing Locations and Sampling Methods to Monitor Atmospheric Deposition at Non-Urban Locations
D5112 – 98(2015) Test Method for Vibration (Horizontal Linear Motion) Test of Products
D5113 – 97(2016) Test Method for Determining Adhesive Attack on Rigid Cellular Foam
D5114/D5114M – 90(2018)e1 Test Method for Laboratory Froth Flotation of Coal in a Mechanical Cell
D5116 – 17 Guide for Small-Scale Environmental Chamber Determinations of Organic Emissions from Indoor Materials/Products
D5117 – 17 Test Method for Dye Penetration of Solid Fiberglass Reinforced Pultruded Stock
D5118/D5118M – 15(2020) Practice for Fabrication of Fiberboard Shipping Boxes
D5121 – 15 Practice for Preparation of Rock Slabs for Durability Testing
D5124 – 96(2018) Practice for Testing and Use of a Random Number Generator in Lumber and Wood Products Simulation
D5125 – 10(2020)e1 Test Method for Viscosity of Paints and Related Materials by ISO Flow Cups
D5126 – 16e1 Guide for Comparison of Field Methods for Determining Hydraulic Conductivity in Vadose Zone
D5127 – 13(2018) Guide for Ultra-Pure Water Used in the Electronics and Semiconductor Industries
D5128 – 14 Test Method for On-Line pH Measurement of Water of Low Conductivity
D5129 – 95(2014)e1 Test Method for Open Channel Flow Measurement of Water Indirectly by Using Width Contractions
D5130 – 95(2014) Test Method for Open-Channel Flow Measurement of Water Indirectly by Slope-Area Method
D5131 – 90(2014) Guide for Record Keeping for Electrodialysis/Electrodialysis Reversal Systems
D5132 – 20 Test Method for Horizontal Burning Rate of Polymeric Materials Used in Occupant Compartments of Motor Vehicles
D5133 – 20a Test Method for Low Temperature, Low Shear Rate, Viscosity/Temperature Dependence of Lubricating Oils Using a Temperature-Scanning Technique
D5134 – 13(2017) Test Method for Detailed Analysis of Petroleum Naphthas through n-Nonane by Capillary Gas Chromatography
D5135 – 16e1 Test Method for Analysis of Styrene by Capillary Gas Chromatography
D5136 – 19 Specification for High Purity p-Xylene
D5137 – 07(2013) Specification for Hexyl Acetate
D5138 – 16 Classification System and Basis for Specification for Liquid Crystal Polymers Molding and Extrusion Materials (LCP)
D5139 – 19 Specification for Sample Preparation for Qualification Testing of Coatings to be Used in Nuclear Power Plants
D5141 – 11(2018) Test Method for Determining Filtering Efficiency and Flow Rate of the Filtration Component of a Sediment Retention Device
D5143 – 06(2015)e1 Test Method for Analysis of Nitroaromatic and Nitramine Explosive in Soil by High Performance Liquid Chromatography
D5144 – 08(2016) Guide for Use of Protective Coating Standards in Nuclear Power Plants
D5145 – 09(2014) Test Methods for Nonvolatile and Pigment Content of Electrocoat Baths
D5146 – 10(2019) Guide to Testing Solvent-Borne Architectural Coatings
D5147/D5147M – 18 Test Methods for Sampling and Testing Modified Bituminous Sheet Material
D5149 – 02(2016) Test Method for Ozone in the Atmosphere: Continuous Measurement by Ethylene Chemiluminescence
D5150 – 92(2017) Test Method for Hiding Power of Architectural Paints Applied by Roller
D5151 – 19 Test Method for Detection of Holes in Medical Gloves
D5153 – 10(2016) Test Method for Palladium in Molecular Sieve Catalyst by Atomic Absorption
D5154/D5154M – 18 Test Method for Determining Activity and Selectivity of Fluid Catalytic Cracking (FCC) Catalysts by Microactivity Test
D5155 – 19 Test Methods for Polyurethane Raw Materials: Determination of the Isocyanate Content of Aromatic Isocyanates
D5156 – 02(2016) Test Methods for Continuous Measurement of Ozone in Ambient, Workplace, and Indoor Atmospheres (Ultraviolet Absorption)
D5157 – 19 Guide for Statistical Evaluation of Indoor Air Quality Models
D5158 – 98(2019) Test Method for Determination of Particle Size of Powdered Activated Carbon by Air-Jet Sieving
D5159 – 04(2020) Guide for Dusting Attrition of Granular Activated Carbon
D5160 – 95(2019) Guide for Gas-Phase Adsorption Testing of Activated Carbon
D5162 – 15 Practice for Discontinuity (Holiday) Testing of Nonconductive Protective Coating on Metallic Substrates
D5163 – 16 Guide for Establishing a Program for Condition Assessment of Coating Service Level I Coating Systems in Nuclear Power Plants
D5164 – 05(2019) Specification for Propylene Glycol and Dipropylene Glycol
D5165 – 12(2020) Practice for Laboratory Preparation of Gelled Vehicles Using a Resin Kettle
D5166 – 97(2016) Practice for Laboratory Preparation of Gelled Vehicle Samples Using a Microwave Oven
D5167 – 13(2018) Practice for Melting of Hot-Applied Joint and Crack Sealant and Filler for Evaluation
D5168 – 12(2017) Practice for Fabrication and Closure of Triple-Wall Corrugated Fiberboard Containers
D5169 – 98(2015) Test Method for Shear Strength (Dynamic Method) of Hook and Loop Touch Fasteners
D5170 – 98(2015) Test Method for Peel Strength (“T” Method) of Hook and Loop Touch Fasteners
D5171 – 15(2020) Test Method for Impact Resistance of Plastic Sew-Through Buttons
D5172 – 91(2015) Guide for Documenting the Standard Operating Procedures Used for the Analysis of Water
D5173 – 15 Guide for On-Line Monitoring of Total Organic Carbon in Water by Oxidation and Detection of Resulting Carbon Dioxide
D5174 – 07(2013) Test Method for Trace Uranium in Water by Pulsed-Laser Phosphorimetry
D5175 – 91(2017)e1 Test Method for Organohalide Pesticides and Polychlorinated Biphenyls in Water by Microextraction and Gas Chromatography
D5176 – 20 Test Method for Total Chemically Bound Nitrogen in Water by Pyrolysis and Chemiluminescence Detection
D5178 – 16 Test Method for Mar Resistance of Organic Coatings
D5179 – 16 Test Method for Measuring Adhesion of Organic Coatings in the Laboratory by Direct Tensile Method
D5181 – 09(2017) Test Method for Abrasion Resistance of Printed Matter by the GA-CAT Comprehensive Abrasion Tester
D5182 – 19 Test Method for Evaluating the Scuffing Load Capacity of Oils (FZG Visual Method)
D5183 – 05(2016) Test Method for Determination of the Coefficient of Friction of Lubricants Using the Four-Ball Wear Test Machine
D5184 – 12(2017) Test Methods for Determination of Aluminum and Silicon in Fuel Oils by Ashing, Fusion, Inductively Coupled Plasma Atomic Emission Spectrometry, and Atomic Absorption Spectrometrye espectrometria de absorção atômicaespectrometría por absorción atómica
D5185 – 18 Test Method for Multielement Determination of Used and Unused Lubricating Oils and Base Oils by Inductively Coupled Plasma Atomic Emission Spectrometry (ICP-AES)inductivamente (ICP-AES)(ICP-AES)1
D5186 – 20 Test Method for Determination of the Aromatic Content and Polynuclear Aromatic Content of Diesel Fuels By Supercritical Fluid Chromatography
D5187 – 21 Test Method for Determination of Crystallite Size (Lc) of Calcined Petroleum Coke by X-Ray Diffraction
D5188 – 16 Test Method for Vapor-Liquid Ratio Temperature Determination of Fuels (Evacuated Chamber and Piston Based Method)
D5191 – 20 Test Method for Vapor Pressure of Petroleum Products and Liquid Fuels (Mini Method)
D5192 – 09(2015) Practice for Collection of Coal Samples from Core
D5193/D5193M – 93(2017) Test Method for Coated Fabrics—Air Retention
D5194 – 18 Test Method for Trace Chloride in Liquid Aromatic Hydrocarbons
D5195 – 14 Test Method for Density of Soil and Rock In-Place at Depths Below Surface by Nuclear Methods
D5196 – 06(2018) Guide for Bio-Applications Grade Water
D5197 – 16 Test Method for Determination of Formaldehyde and Other Carbonyl Compounds in Air (Active Sampler Methodology)
D5198 – 17 Practice for Nitric Acid Digestion of Solid Waste
D5199 – 12(2019) Test Method for Measuring the Nominal Thickness of Geosynthetics
D5200 – 03(2014) Test Method for Determination of Weight Percent Volatile Content of Solvent-Borne Paints in Aerosol Cans

D5201–D5300
D5201 – 05a(2020) Practice for Calculating Formulation Physical Constants of Paints and Coatings
D5202/D5202M – 16 Test Method for Determining Triaxial Compression Creep Strength of Chemically Grouted Soils
D5204 – 19 Classification System and Basis for Specification for Polyamide-Imide (PAI) Molding and Extrusion Materials
D5205 – 16 Classification System and Basis for Specification for Polyetherimide (PEI) Materials
D5206 – 19 Test Method for Windload Resistance of Rigid Plastic Siding
D5207 – 20 Practice for Confirmation of 20-mm (50-W) and 125-mm (500-W) Test Flames for Small-Scale Burning Tests on Plastic Materials
D5208 – 14 Practice for Fluorescent Ultraviolet (UV) Exposure of Photodegradable Plastics
D5211 – 19 Specification for Xylenes for p-Xylene Feedstock
D5213 – 19 Specification for Polymeric Resin Film for Electrical Insulation and Dielectric Applications
D5215 – 93(2012) Test Method for Instrumental Evaluation of Staining of Vinyl Flooring by Adhesives
D5217 – 17 Guide for Detection of Fouling and Degradation of Particulate Ion Exchange Materials
D5219 – 15 Terminology Relating to Body Dimensions for Apparel Sizing
D5220 – 14 Test Method for Water Mass per Unit Volume of Soil and Rock In-Place by the Neutron Depth Probe Method
D5222 – 16 Specification for High Fire-Point Mineral Electrical Insulating Oils
D5224 – 12(2019) Practice for Compression Molding Test Specimens of Thermosetting Molding Compounds
D5225 – 17 Test Method for Measuring Solution Viscosity of Polymers with a Differential Viscometer
D5226 – 16 Practice for Dissolving Polymer Materials
D5227 – 13 Test Method for Measurement of Hexane Extractable Content of Polyolefins
D5228 – 16 Test Method for Determination of Butane Working Capacity of Activated Carbon
D5229/D5229M – 20 Test Method for Moisture Absorption Properties and Equilibrium Conditioning of Polymer Matrix Composite Materials
D5230 – 19 Test Method for Carbon Black—Automated Individual Pellet Hardness
D5231 – 92(2016) Test Method for Determination of the Composition of Unprocessed Municipal Solid Waste
D5232 – 19 Practice for Determining the Stability and Miscibility of a Solid, Semi-Solid, or Liquid Waste Material
D5233 – 92(2017) Test Method for Single Batch Extraction Method for Wastes
D5234 – 92(2017) Guide for Analysis of Ethylene Product
D5235 – 18 Test Method for Microscopic Measurement of Dry Film Thickness of Coatings on Wood Products
D5236 – 18a Test Method for Distillation of Heavy Hydrocarbon Mixtures (Vacuum Potstill Method)
D5237 – 14(2019) Guide for Evaluating Fabric Softeners
D5239 – 12e1 Practice for Characterizing Fly Ash for Use in Soil Stabilization
D5240/D5240M – 20 Test Method for Evaluation of the Durability of Rock for Erosion Control Using Sodium Sulfate or Magnesium Sulfate
D5241 – 92(2017) Practice for Micro-Extraction of Water for Analysis of Volatile and Semi-Volatile Organic Compounds in Water
D5242 – 92(2013) Test Method for Open-Channel Flow Measurement of Water with Thin-Plate Weirs
D5243 – 92(2019) Test Method for Open-Channel Flow Measurement of Water Indirectly at Culverts
D5245 – 19 Practice for Cleaning Laboratory Glassware, Plasticware, and Equipment Used in Microbiological Analyses
D5246 – 19 Test Method for Isolation and Enumeration of Pseudomonas aeruginosa from Water
D5248 – 04(2020) Specification for Reclaimed 1,1,2-Trichloro 1,2,2-Trifluoroethane
D5249 – 10(2016) Specification for Backer Material for Use with Cold- and Hot-Applied Joint Sealants in Portland-Cement Concrete and Asphalt Joints
D5250 – 19 Specification for Poly(vinyl chloride) Gloves for Medical Application
D5252 – 20 Practice for the Operation of the Hexapod Tumble Drum Tester
D5253 – 04(2016) Terminology Relating to Floor Coverings and Textile Upholstered Furniture
D5255 – 15 Practice for Certification of Personnel Engaged in the Testing of Soil and Rock
D5256 – 14 Test Method for Relative Efficacy of Dynamic Solvent Systems for Dissolving Water-Formed Deposits
D5257 – 17 Test Method for Dissolved Hexavalent Chromium in Water by Ion Chromatography
D5258 – 02(2013) Practice for Acid-Extraction of Elements from Sediments Using Closed Vessel Microwave Heating
D5259 – 19 Test Method for Isolation and Enumeration of Enterococci from Water by the Membrane Filter Procedure
D5260 – 16 Classification for Chemical Resistance of Poly(Vinyl Chloride) (PVC) Homopolymer and Copolymer Compounds and Chlorinated Poly(Vinyl Chloride) (CPVC) Compounds
D5261 – 10(2018) Test Method for Measuring Mass per Unit Area of Geotextiles
D5262 – 07(2016) Test Method for Evaluating the Unconfined Tension Creep and Creep Rupture Behavior of Geosynthetics
D5263 – 15 Test Method for Determining the Relative Degree of Oxidation in Bituminous Coal by Alkali Extraction
D5264 – 98(2019) Practice for Abrasion Resistance of Printed Materials by the Sutherland Rub Tester
D5265 – 09(2016) Test Method for Bridge Impact Testing
D5266 – 13(2020) Practice for Estimating the Percentage of Wood Failure in Adhesive Bonded Joints
D5267 – 97(2017) Test Method for Determination of Extrudability of Cartridge Adhesives
D5268 – 19e1 Specification for Topsoil Used for Landscaping and Construction Purposes
D5269 – 15 Test Method for Determining Transmissivity of Nonleaky Confined Aquifers by the Theis Recovery Method
D5270/D5270M – 20 Practice for (Analytical Procedures) Determining Transmissivity and Storage Coefficient of Bounded, Nonleaky, Confined Aquifers
D5272 – 08(2013) Practice for Outdoor Exposure Testing of Photodegradable Plastics
D5273 – 18 Guide for Analysis of Propylene Concentrates
D5274 – 00(2019) Guide for Analysis of 1,3–Butadiene Product
D5275 – 20 Test Method for Fuel Injector Shear Stability Test (FISST) for Polymer Containing Fluids
D5276 – 19 Test Method for Drop Test of Loaded Containers by Free Fall
D5277 – 92(2015) Test Method for Performing Programmed Horizontal Impacts Using an Inclined Impact Tester
D5278/D5278M – 09(2017) Test Method for Elongation of Narrow Elastic Fabrics (Static-Load Testing)
D5279 – 13 Test Method for Plastics: Dynamic Mechanical Properties: In Torsion
D5280 – 96(2013) Practice for Evaluation of Performance Characteristics of Air Quality Measurement Methods with Linear Calibration Functions
D5282 – 05(2020) Test Methods for Compatibility of Construction Material with Silicone Fluid Used for Electrical Insulation
D5283 – 18 Practice for Generation of Environmental Data Related to Waste Management Activities: Quality Assurance and Quality Control Planning and Implementation
D5284 – 09(2017) Test Method for Sequential Batch Extraction of Waste with Acidic Extraction Fluid
D5286 – 20 Test Methods for Determination of Transfer Efficiency Under General Production Conditions for Spray Application of Paints
D5287 – 08(2015) Practice for Automatic Sampling of Gaseous Fuels
D5288 – 14 Test Method for Determining Tracking Index of Electrical Insulating Materials Using Various Electrode Materials (Excluding Platinum)
D5289 – 19a Test Method for Rubber Property—Vulcanization Using Rotorless Cure Meters
D5291 – 16 Test Methods for Instrumental Determination of Carbon, Hydrogen, and Nitrogen in Petroleum Products and Lubricants
D5293 – 20 Test Method for Apparent Viscosity of Engine Oils and Base Stocks Between −10 °C and −35 °C Using Cold-Cranking Simulator
D5295/D5295M – 18 Guide for Preparation of Concrete Surfaces for Adhered (Bonded) Membrane Waterproofing Systems
D5296 – 19 Test Method for Molecular Weight Averages and Molecular Weight Distribution of Polystyrene by High Performance Size-Exclusion Chromatography
D5297 – 95(2019) Test Methods for Rubber Chemical Accelerator—Purity by High Performance Liquid Chromatography
D5298 – 16 Test Method for Measurement of Soil Potential (Suction) Using Filter Paper
D5299/D5299M – 18 Guide for Decommissioning of Groundwater Wells, Vadose Zone Monitoring Devices, Boreholes, and Other Devices for Environmental Activities

D5301–D5400
D5301 – 92(2016) Practice for Physical Characterization of Paint Brushes
D5303 – 20 Test Method for Trace Carbonyl Sulfide in Propylene by Gas Chromatography
D5304 – 20 Test Method for Assessing Middle Distillate Fuel Storage Stability by Oxygen Overpressure
D5305 – 18e1 Test Method for Determination of Ethyl Mercaptan in LP-Gas Vapor
D5306 – 92(2018) Test Method for Linear Flame Propagation Rate of Lubricating Oils and Hydraulic Fluids
D5309 – 17 Specification for Cyclohexane 999
D5310 – 10(2018) Test Method for Tar Acid Composition by Capillary Gas Chromatography
D5311/D5311M – 13 Test Method for Load Controlled Cyclic Triaxial Strength of Soil
D5312/D5312M – 12(2013) Test Method for Evaluation of Durability of Rock for Erosion Control Under Freezing and Thawing Conditions
D5313/D5313M – 12(2013) Test Method for Evaluation of Durability of Rock for Erosion Control Under Wetting and Drying Conditions
D5315 – 04(2017)e1 Test Method for Determination of N-Methyl-Carbamoyloximes and N-Methylcarbamates in Water by Direct Aqueous Injection HPLC with Post-Column Derivatization
D5316 – 98(2017) Test Method for 1,2-Dibromoethane and 1,2-Dibromo-3-Chloropropane in Water by Microextraction and Gas Chromatography
D5317 – 20 Test Method for Determination of Chlorinated Organic Acid Compounds in Water by Gas Chromatography with an Electron Capture Detector
D5319 – 17 Specification for Glass-Fiber Reinforced Polyester Wall and Ceiling Panels
D5321/D5321M – 20 Test Method for Determining the Shear Strength of Soil-Geosynthetic and Geosynthetic-Geosynthetic Interfaces by Direct Shear
D5322 – 17 Practice for Laboratory Immersion Procedures for Evaluating the Chemical Resistance of Geosynthetics to Liquids
D5323 – 19a Practice for Determination of 2% Secant Modulus for Polyethylene Geomembranes
D5324 – 16 Guide for Testing Water-Borne Architectural Coatings
D5325 – 03(2014) Test Method for Determination of Weight Percent Volatile Content of Water-Borne Aerosol Paints
D5326 – 94a(2013) Test Method for Color Development in Tinted Latex Paints
D5327 – 97(2013) Practice for Evaluating and Comparing Transfer Efficiency of Spray Applied Coatings Under General Laboratory Conditions
D5329 – 20 Test Methods for Sealants and Fillers, Hot-Applied, for Joints and Cracks in Asphalt Pavements and Portland Cement Concrete Pavements
D5330/D5330M – 06(2020) Specification for Pressure-Sensitive Tape for Packaging, Filament-Reinforced
D5331 – 03(2016) Test Method for Evaluation of Mechanical Handling of Unitized Loads Secured with Stretch Wrap Films
D5334 – 14 Test Method for Determination of Thermal Conductivity of Soil and Soft Rock by Thermal Needle Probe Procedure
D5335 – 14 Test Method for Linear Coefficient of Thermal Expansion of Rock Using Bonded Electric Resistance Strain Gauges
D5336 – 15a Classification System and Basis for Specification for Polyphthalamide (PPA) Injection Molding Material
D5337 – 11(2016) Practice for Flow Rate Adjustment of Personal Sampling Pumps
D5338 – 15(2021) Test Method for Determining Aerobic Biodegradation of Plastic Materials Under Controlled Composting Conditions, Incorporating Thermophilic Temperatures
D5340 – 20 Test Method for Airport Pavement Condition Index Surveys
D5341/D5341M – 19 Test Method for Measuring Coke Reactivity Index (CRI) and Coke Strength After Reaction (CSR)
D5343 – 06(2018) Guide for Evaluating Cleaning Performance of Ceramic Tile Cleaners
D5344 – 99(2017) Test Method for Extension Force of Partially Oriented Yarn
D5346 – 17 Test Method for Determination of the Pour Point of Petroleum Oil Used in Fatliquors and Softening Compounds
D5347 – 19a Test Method for Determination of the Ash Content of Fats and Oils
D5348 – 95(2019) Test Method for Determination of the Moisture Content of Sulfonated and Sulfated Oils by Distillation with Xylene
D5349 – 19 Test Method for Determination of the Moisture and Volatile Content of Sulfonated, Sulfated Oils and Fatliquors by Oven Method
D5350 – 95(2019) Test Method for Determination of Organically Combined Sulfuric Anhydride by Titration, Test Method A
D5351 – 93(2017) Test Method for Determination of Organically Combined Sulfuric Anhydride by Extraction Titration, Test Method B
D5352 – 95(2019) Test Method for Determination of Organically Combined Sulfuric Anhydride Ash-Gravimetric, Test Method C
D5353 – 95(2019) Test Method for Determination of Total Desulfated Fatty Matter
D5354 – 95(2020) Test Method for Determination of Total Active Ingredients in Sulfonated and Sulfated Oils
D5355 – 95(2017) Test Method for Specific Gravity of Oils and Liquid Fats
D5356 – 17a Test Method for pH of Chrome Tanning Solutions
D5357 – 19 Test Method for Determination of Relative Crystallinity of Zeolite Sodium A by X-ray Diffraction
D5358 – 93(2019) Practice for Sampling With a Dipper or Pond Sampler
D5359 – 98(2015) Specification for Glass Cullet Recovered from Waste for Use in Manufacture of Glass Fiber
D5360 – 15 Practice for Design and Construction of Bituminous Surface Treatments
D5361/D5361M – 16 Practice for Sampling Compacted Asphalt Mixtures for Laboratory Testing
D5362 – 13(2018) Test Method for Snagging Resistance of Fabrics (Bean Bag)
D5363 – 16 Specification for Anaerobic Single-Component Adhesives (AN)
D5364 – 14(2019) Guide for Design, Fabrication, and Erection of Fiberglass Reinforced (FRP) Plastic Chimney Liners with Coal-Fired Units
D5365 – 18 Test Method for Long-Term Ring-Bending Strain of “Fiberglass” (Glass-Fiber-Reinforced Thermosetting-Resin) Pipe
D5366 – 96(2017) Test Method for Determining the Dynamic Performance of a Wind Vane
D5367 – 16 Practice for Evaluating Coatings Applied Over Surfaces Treated With Inhibitors Used to Prevent Flash Rusting of Steel When Water or Water/Abrasive Blasted
D5372 – 20 Guide for Evaluation of Hydrocarbon Heat Transfer Fluids
D5373 – 16 Test Methods for Determination of Carbon, Hydrogen and Nitrogen in Analysis Samples of Coal and Carbon in Analysis Samples of Coal and Coke
D5374 – 13 Test Methods for Forced-Convection Laboratory Ovens for Evaluation of Electrical Insulation
D5375/D5375M – 98(2019) Test Methods for Liner Removal at High Speeds from Pressure-Sensitive Label Stock
D5376 – 06(2017) Test Method for Rubber Compounding Materials—Determination of the Basic Nitrogen Content in Rubber Antioxidant: Polymerized TMQ
D5377 – 93(2017) Classification for Rubber Compounding Materials—Ground Coal
D5378 – 12(2019) Performance Specification for Woven and Knitted Shower Curtains for Institutional and Household Use
D5379/D5379M – 19 Test Method for Shear Properties of Composite Materials by the V-Notched Beam Method
D5380 – 93(2014) Test Method for Identification of Crystalline Pigments and Extenders in Paint by X-Ray Diffraction Analysis
D5381 – 93(2014) Guide for X-Ray Fluorescence (XRF) Spectroscopy of Pigments and Extenders
D5382 – 02(2017) Guide to Evaluation of Optical Properties of Powder Coatings
D5383 – 16 Practice for Visual Determination of the Lightfastness of Art Materials by Artists and Art Technologists
D5384 – 14(2019) Test Methods for Chlorine in Used Petroleum Products (Field Test Kit Method)
D5385/D5385M – 20 Test Method for Hydrostatic Pressure Resistance of Waterproofing Membranes
D5386 – 16 Test Method for Color of Liquids Using Tristimulus Colorimetry
D5387 – 93(2019) Guide for Elements of a Complete Data Set for Non-Cohesive Sediments
D5388 – 93(2013) Test Method for Indirect Measurements of Discharge by Step-Backwater Method
D5389 – 93(2019) Test Method for Open-Channel Flow Measurement by Acoustic Velocity Meter Systems
D5390 – 93(2013) Test Method for Open-Channel Flow Measurement of Water with Palmer-Bowlus Flumes
D5391 – 14 Test Method for Electrical Conductivity and Resistivity of a Flowing High Purity Water Sample
D5392 – 19 Test Method for Isolation and Enumeration of Escherichia coli in Water by the Two-Step Membrane Filter Procedure
D5395 – 03(2018) Specification for Reclaimed Methylene Chloride
D5396 – 04(2020) Specification for Reclaimed Perchloroethylene
D5397 – 20 Test Method for Evaluation of Stress Crack Resistance of Polyolefin Geomembranes Using Notched Constant Tensile Load Test
D5399 – 09(2017) Test Method for Boiling Point Distribution of Hydrocarbon Solvents by Gas Chromatography
D5400 – 15 Test Methods for Hydroxypropylcellulose

D5401–D5500
D5401 – 03(2014) Test Method for Evaluating Clear Water Repellent Coatings on Wood
D5402 – 19 Practice for Assessing the Solvent Resistance of Organic Coatings Using Solvent Rubs
D5403 – 93(2013) Test Methods for Volatile Content of Radiation Curable Materials
D5404/D5404M – 12(2017) Practice for Recovery of Asphalt from Solution Using the Rotary Evaporator
D5405/D5405M – 98(2015) Test Method for Conducting Time-to-Failure (Creep-Rupture) Tests of Joints Fabricated from Nonbituminous Organic Roof Membrane Material
D5406 – 93(2016) Practice for Rubber—Calculation of Producer's Process Performance Indexes
D5411 – 10(2015) Practice for Calculation of Average Energy Per Disintegration (¯E) for a Mixture of Radionuclides in Reactor Coolant
D5412 – 93(2017)e1 Test Method for Quantification of Complex Polycyclic Aromatic Hydrocarbon Mixtures or Petroleum Oils in Water
D5413 – 93(2013) Test Methods for Measurement of Water Levels in Open-Water Bodies
D5414 – 95(2020) Test Method for Evaluation of Horizontal Impact Performance of Load Unitizing Stretch Wrap Films
D5415 – 95(2020) Test Method for Evaluating Load Containment Performance of Stretch Wrap Films by Vibration Testing
D5416 – 95(2020) Test Method for Evaluating Abrasion Resistance of Stretch Wrap Films by Vibration Testing
D5417 – 16 Practice for Operation of the Vettermann Drum Tester
D5418 – 15 Test Method for Plastics: Dynamic Mechanical Properties: In Flexure (Dual Cantilever Beam)
D5419 – 14a Test Method for Environmental Stress Crack Resistance (ESCR) of Threaded Plastic Closures
D5420 – 16 Test Method for Impact Resistance of Flat, Rigid Plastic Specimen by Means of a Striker Impacted by a Falling Weight (Gardner Impact)
D5421 – 15 Specification for Contact Molded “Fiberglass” (Glass-Fiber-Reinforced Thermosetting Resin) Flanges
D5422 – 17 Test Method for Measurement of Properties of Thermoplastic Materials by Screw-Extrusion Capillary Rheometer
D5423 – 14 Specification for Forced-Convection Laboratory Ovens for Evaluation of Electrical Insulation
D5424 – 18 Test Method for Smoke Obscuration of Insulating Materials Contained in Electrical or Optical Fiber Cables When Burning in a Vertical Cable Tray Configuration
D5425 – 18 Guide for Development of Fire Hazard Assessment Standards of Electrotechnical Products
D5426 – 19 Practices for Visual Inspection and Grading of Fabrics Used for Inflatable Restraints
D5427 – 09(2019) Practice for Accelerated Aging of Inflatable Restraint Fabrics
D5428 – 08(2019) Practice for Evaluating the Performance of Inflatable Restraint Modules
D5430 – 13(2017) Test Methods for Visually Inspecting and Grading Fabrics
D5431 – 08(2019) Performance Specification for Woven and Knitted Sheeting Products for Institutional and Household Use
D5432 – 12(2019) Performance Specification for Blanket Products for Institutional and Household Use
D5433 – 12(2019) Performance Specification for Towel Products for Institutional and Household Use
D5434 – 12 Guide for Field Logging of Subsurface Explorations of Soil and Rock
D5436 – 15(2020) Specification for Cast Poly(Methyl Methacrylate) Plastic Rods, Tubes, and Shapes
D5438 – 17 Practice for Collection of Floor Dust for Chemical Analysis
D5439 – 95(2019) Test Method for Determination of Sediment in Moellon
D5440 – 17 Test Method for Determining the Melting Point of Fats and Oils
D5441 – 98(2017) Test Method for Analysis of Methyl Tert-Butyl Ether (MTBE) by Gas Chromatography
D5442 – 17 Test Method for Analysis of Petroleum Waxes by Gas Chromatography
D5443 – 14(2018) Test Method for Paraffin, Naphthene, and Aromatic Hydrocarbon Type Analysis in Petroleum Distillates Through 200 °C by Multi-Dimensional Gas Chromatography
D5444 – 15 Test Method for Mechanical Size Analysis of Extracted Aggregate
D5445 – 15 Practice for Pictorial Markings for Handling of Goods
D5446 – 08(2019) Practice for Determining Physical Properties of Fabrics, Yarns, and Sewing Thread Used in Inflatable Restraints
D5447 – 17 Guide for Application of a Numerical Groundwater Flow Model to a Site-Specific Problem
D5448/D5448M – 16 Test Method for Inplane Shear Properties of Hoop Wound Polymer Matrix Composite Cylinders
D5449/D5449M – 16 Test Method for Transverse Compressive Properties of Hoop Wound Polymer Matrix Composite Cylinders
D5450/D5450M – 16 Test Method for Transverse Tensile Properties of Hoop Wound Polymer Matrix Composite Cylinders
D5451 – 93(2016) Practice for Sampling Using a Trier Sampler
D5452 – 20 Test Method for Particulate Contamination in Aviation Fuels by Laboratory Filtration
D5453 – 19a Test Method for Determination of Total Sulfur in Light Hydrocarbons, Spark Ignition Engine Fuel, Diesel Engine Fuel, and Engine Oil by Ultraviolet Fluorescence
D5454 – 11(2020) Test Method for Water Vapor Content of Gaseous Fuels Using Electronic Moisture Analyzers*D5456 – 19 Specification for Evaluation of Structural Composite Lumber Products
D5457 – 20 Specification for Computing Reference Resistance of Wood-Based Materials and Structural Connections for Load and Resistance Factor Design
D5458 – 95(2020) Test Method for Peel Cling of Stretch Wrap Film
D5459 – 95(2020) Test Method for Machine Direction Elastic Recovery and Permanent Deformation and Stress Retention of Stretch Wrap Film
D5460 – 02(2017) Test Method for Rubber Compounding Materials—Water in Rubber Additives
D5461 – 06(2017) Test Method for Rubber Compounding Materials—Wet Sieve Analysis of Powdered Rubber Compounding Materials
D5462 – 13 Test Method for On-Line Measurement of Low-Level Dissolved Oxygen in Water
D5463 – 18 Guide for Use of Test Kits to Measure Inorganic Constituents in Water
D5464 – 16 Test Method for pH Measurement of Water of Low Conductivity
D5465 – 16(2020) Practices for Determining Microbial Colony Counts from Waters Analyzed by Plating Methods
D5466 – 15 Test Method for Determination of Volatile Organic Compounds in Atmospheres (Canister Sampling Methodology)
D5467/D5467M – 97(2017) Test Method for Compressive Properties of Unidirectional Polymer Matrix Composite Materials Using a Sandwich Beam
D5469/D5469M – 12 Guide for Application of New Spray Applied Polyurethane Foam and Coated Roofing Systems
D5470 – 17 Test Method for Thermal Transmission Properties of Thermally Conductive Electrical Insulation Materials
D5471 – 18 Specification for O-Xylene 980
D5472/D5472M – 20 Practice for Determining Specific Capacity and Estimating Transmissivity at the Control Well
D5473/D5473M – 20 Practice for (Analytical Procedures) Analyzing the Effects of Partial Penetration of Control Well and Determining the Horizontal and Vertical Hydraulic Conductivity in a Nonleaky Confined Aquifer
D5474 – 93(2012) Guide for Selection of Data Elements for Groundwater Investigations
D5477 – 18 Practice for Identification of Polymer Layers or Inclusions by Fourier Transform Infrared Microspectroscopy (FT-IR)
D5478 – 13(2018) Test Methods for Viscosity of Materials by a Falling Needle Viscometer
D5479 – 94(2020) Practice for Testing Biofouling Resistance of Marine Coatings Partially Immersed
D5481 – 21 Test Method for Measuring Apparent Viscosity at High-Temperature and High-Shear Rate by Multicell Capillary Viscometer
D5482 – 20a Test Method for Vapor Pressure of Petroleum Products and Liquid Fuels (Mini Method—Atmospheric)
D5483 – 20 Test Method for Oxidation Induction Time of Lubricating Greases by Pressure Differential Scanning Calorimetry
D5485 – 16 Test Method for Determining the Corrosive Effect of Combustion Products Using the Cone Corrosimeter
D5486/D5486M – 06(2020) Specification for Pressure-Sensitive Tape for Packaging, Box Closure, and Sealing
D5487 – 16 Test Method for Simulated Drop of Loaded Containers by Shock Machines
D5489 – 18 Guide for Care Symbols for Care Instructions on Textile Products
D5490 – 93(2014)e1 Guide for Comparing Groundwater Flow Model Simulations to Site-Specific Information
D5491 – 08(2014) Classification for Recycled Post-Consumer Polyethylene Film Sources for Molding and Extrusion Materials
D5492 – 17 Test Method for Determination of Xylene Solubles in Propylene Plastics
D5493 – 06(2016) Test Method for Permittivity of Geotextiles Under Load
D5494 – 93(2018) Test Method for the Determination of Pyramid Puncture Resistance of Unprotected and Protected Geomembranes
D5495 – 03(2016) Practice for Sampling With a Composite Liquid Waste Sampler (COLIWASA)
D5496 – 15(2020) Practice for In-Field Immersion Testing of Geosynthetics
D5498 – 12a(2018) Guide for Developing a Training Program for Personnel Performing Coating and Lining Work Inspection for Nuclear Facilities
D5499 – 94(2013) Test Methods for Heat Resistance of Polymer Linings for Flue Gas Desulfurization Systems
D5500 – 20a Test Method for Vehicle Evaluation of Unleaded Automotive Spark-Ignition Engine Fuel for Intake Valve Deposit Formation

D5501–D5600
D5501 – 20 Test Method for Determination of Ethanol and Methanol Content in Fuels Containing Greater than 20% Ethanol by Gas Chromatography
D5502 – 00(2015) Test Method for Apparent Density by Physical Measurements of Manufactured Anode and Cathode Carbon Used by the Aluminum Industry
D5504 – 20 Test Method for Determination of Sulfur Compounds in Natural Gas and Gaseous Fuels by Gas Chromatography and Chemiluminescence
D5505 – 14(2020) Practice for Classifying Emulsified Recycling Agents
D5507 – 99(2012) Test Method for Determination of Trace Organic Impurities in Monomer Grade Vinyl Chloride by Capillary Column/Multidimensional Gas Chromatography
D5508 – 16 Test Method for Determination of Residual Acrylonitrile Monomer in Styrene-Acrylonitrile Copolymer Resins and Nitrile-Butadiene Rubber by Headspace-Capillary Gas Chromatography (HS-CGC)
D5511 – 18 Test Method for Determining Anaerobic Biodegradation of Plastic Materials Under High-Solids Anaerobic-Digestion Conditions
D5513 – 15 Practice for Microwave Digestion of Industrial Furnace Feed Streams and Waste for Trace Element Analysis
D5514/D5514M – 18 Test Method for Large-Scale Hydrostatic Puncture Testing of Geosynthetics
D5515 – 20 Test Method for Determination of the Swelling Properties of Bituminous Coal Using a Dilatometer
D5516 – 18 Test Method for Evaluating the Flexural Properties of Fire-Retardant Treated Softwood Plywood Exposed to Elevated Temperatures
D5517 – 14 Test Method for Determining Extractability of Metals from Art Materials
D5519 – 15 Test Methods for Particle Size Analysis of Natural and Man-Made Riprap Materials
D5520 – 18 Test Method for Laboratory Determination of Creep Properties of Frozen Soil Samples by Uniaxial Compression
D5521/D5521M – 18 Guide for Development of Groundwater Monitoring Wells in Granular Aquifers
D5523 – 15 Test Method for Polyurethane Raw Materials: Acidity by Argentometric Determination of Hydrolyzable Chlorine in Monomeric, Aromatic Isocyanates
D5526 – 18 Test Method for Determining Anaerobic Biodegradation of Plastic Materials Under Accelerated Landfill Conditions
D5527 – 00(2017)e1 Practices for Measuring Surface Wind and Temperature by Acoustic Means
D5528 – 13 Test Method for Mode I Interlaminar Fracture Toughness of Unidirectional Fiber-Reinforced Polymer Matrix Composites
D5530 – 15 Test Method for Total Moisture of Hazardous Waste Fuel by Karl Fischer Titrimetry
D5531 – 17 Guide for Preparation, Maintenance, and Distribution of Physical Product Standards for Color and Geometric Appearance of Coatings
D5534 – 94(2018) Test Method for Vapor-Phase Rust-Preventing Characteristics of Hydraulic Fluids
D5536 – 17 Practice for Sampling Forest Trees for Determination of Clear Wood Properties
D5537 – 18 Test Method for Heat Release, Flame Spread, Smoke Obscuration, and Mass Loss Testing of Insulating Materials Contained in Electrical or Optical Fiber Cables When Burning in a Vertical Cable Tray Configuration
D5538 – 13(2018) Practice for Thermoplastic Elastomers—Terminology and Abbreviations
D5540 – 13 Practice for Flow Control and Temperature Control for On-Line Water Sampling and Analysis
D5541 – 94(2014) Practice for Developing a Stage-Discharge Relation for Open Channel Flow
D5542 – 16 Test Methods for Trace Anions in High Purity Water by Ion Chromatography
D5543 – 15 Test Method for Low-Level Dissolved Oxygen in Water
D5544 – 16 Test Method for On-Line Measurement of Residue After Evaporation of High-Purity Water
D5547 – 95(2017) Test Method for Clay and Zeolite in Powdered Laundry Detergents by Atomic Absorption
D5548 – 13(2020) Guide for Evaluating Color Transfer or Color Loss of Dyed Fabrics in Laundering (Not Suitable for Detergent or Washing Machine Rankings)
D5549 – 19 Guide for Contents of Geostatistical Site Investigation Report
D5550 – 14 Test Method for Specific Gravity of Soil Solids by Gas Pycnometer
D5551 – 95(2019) Test Method for Determination of the Cloud Point of Oil
D5552 – 10(2015) Test Method for Resistance of Colored Leather to Bleeding
D5553 – 95(2019) Test Method for Determination of the Unsaponifiable Nonvolatile Matter in Sulfated Oils
D5554 – 15 Test Method for Determination of the Iodine Value of Fats and Oils
D5555 – 95(2017) Test Method for Determination of Free Fatty Acids Contained in Animal, Marine, and Vegetable Fats and Oils Used in Fat Liquors and Stuffing Compounds
D5556 – 19 Test Method for Determination of the Moisture and Other Volatile Matter Contained in Fats and Oils Used in Fatliquors and Softening Compounds
D5557 – 95(2017) Test Method for Determination of Insoluble Impurities Contained in Fats and Oils Used in Fat Liquors and Stuffing Compounds
D5558 – 95(2017) Test Method for Determination of the Saponification Value of Fats and Oils
D5559 – 95(2017) Test Method for Determination of Acidity as Free Fatty Acids/Acid Number in the Absence of Ammonium or Triethanolamine Soaps in Sulfonated and Sulfated Oils
D5560 – 95(2018) Test Method for Determination of Neutral Fatty Matter Contained in Fats and Oils
D5562 – 95(2018) Test Method for Determination of the Acidity as Free Fatty Acids/Acid Number in the Presence of Ammonium or Triethanolamine Soaps
D5564 – 95(2018) Test Method for Determination of the Total Ammonia Contained in Sulfonated or Sulfated Oils
D5567 – 94(2018) Test Method for Hydraulic Conductivity Ratio (HCR) Testing of Soil/Geotextile Systems
D5568 – 14 Test Method for Measuring Relative Complex Permittivity and Relative Magnetic Permeability of Solid Materials at Microwave Frequencies Using Waveguide
D5570/D5570M – 10(2015) Test Method for Water Resistance of Tape and Adhesives Used as Box Closure
D5571 – 16 Test Method for Environmental Stress Crack Resistance (ESCR) of Plastic Tighthead Drums Not Exceeding 60 Gal (227 L) in Rated Capacity
D5572 – 95(2019) Specification for Adhesives Used for Finger Joints in Nonstructural Lumber Products
D5573 – 99(2019) Practice for Classifying Failure Modes in Fiber-Reinforced-Plastic (FRP) Joints
D5574 – 94(2012) Test Methods for Establishing Allowable Mechanical Properties of Wood-Bonding Adhesives for Design of Structural Joints
D5575 – 18 Classification System for Copolymers of Vinylidene Fluoride (VDF) with Other Fluorinated Monomers
D5576 – 00(2013) Practice for Determination of Structural Features in Polyolefins and Polyolefin Copolymers by Infrared Spectrophotometry (FT-IR)
D5577 – 19 Guide for Techniques to Separate and Identify Contaminants in Recycled Plastics
D5578 – 04(2015) Test Method for Determination of Ethylene Oxide in Workplace Atmospheres (HBr Derivatization Method)
D5579 – 19 Test Method for Evaluating the Thermal Stability of Manual Transmission Lubricants in a Cyclic Durability Test
D5580 – 15(2020) Test Method for Determination of Benzene, Toluene, Ethylbenzene, p/m-Xylene, o-Xylene, C9 and Heavier Aromatics, and Total Aromatics in Finished Gasoline by Gas Chromatography
D5581 – 07a(2013) Test Method for Resistance to Plastic Flow of Bituminous Mixtures Using Marshall Apparatus (6 inch-Diameter Specimen)
D5582 – 14 Test Method for Determining Formaldehyde Levels from Wood Products Using a Desiccator
D5587 – 15(2019) Test Method for Tearing Strength of Fabrics by Trapezoid Procedure
D5588 – 97(2017) Test Method for Determination of the Microbial Condition of Paint, Paint Raw Materials, and Plant Areas
D5589 – 19 Test Method for Determining the Resistance of Paint Films and Related Coatings to Algal Defacement
D5590 – 17 Test Method for Determining the Resistance of Paint Films and Related Coatings to Fungal Defacement by Accelerated Four-Week Agar Plate Assay
D5591 – 04(2016) Test Method for Thermal Shrinkage Force of Yarn and Cord With a Thermal Shrinkage Force Tester
D5592 – 94(2018) Guide for Material Properties Needed in Engineering Design Using Plastics
D5594 – 18a Test Method for Determination of the Vinyl Acetate Content of Ethylene-Vinyl Acetate (EVA) Copolymers by Fourier Transform Infrared Spectroscopy (FT-IR)
D5596 – 03(2016) Test Method For Microscopic Evaluation of the Dispersion of Carbon Black in Polyolefin Geosynthetics
D5598 – 20 Test Method for Evaluating Unleaded Automotive Spark-Ignition Engine Fuel for Electronic Port Fuel Injector Fouling
D5599 – 18 Test Method for Determination of Oxygenates in Gasoline by Gas Chromatography and Oxygen Selective Flame Ionization Detection
D5599 – 18 Test Method for Determination of Oxygenates in Gasoline by Gas Chromatography and Oxygen Selective Flame Ionization Detection
D5600 – 17 Test Method for Trace Metals in Petroleum Coke by Inductively Coupled Plasma Atomic Emission Spectrometry (ICP-AES)

D5601–D5700
D5602/D5602M – 18 Test Method for Static Puncture Resistance of Roofing Membrane Specimens
D5603 – 19a Classification for Rubber Compounding Materials—Recycled Vulcanizate Rubber
D5604 – 96(2017) Test Methods for Precipitated Silica—Surface Area by Single Point B.E.T. Nitrogen Adsorption
D5605 – 94(2016) Practice for Styrene-Butadiene Rubber (SBR)—Establishing Raw Mooney Viscosity Target Values
D5606 – 19 Specification for Toluene for Toluene Diisocyanate (TDI) Feedstock
D5607 – 16 Test Method for Performing Laboratory Direct Shear Strength Tests of Rock Specimens Under Constant Normal Force
D5608 – 16 Practices for Decontamination of Sampling and Non Sample Contacting Equipment Used at Low Level Radioactive Waste Sites
D5609 – 16 Guide for Defining Boundary Conditions in Groundwater Flow Modeling
D5610 – 94(2014) Guide for Defining Initial Conditions in Groundwater Flow Modeling
D5611 – 94(2016) Guide for Conducting a Sensitivity Analysis for a Groundwater Flow Model Application
D5612 – 94(2018) Guide for Quality Planning and Field Implementation of a Water Quality Measurement Program
D5613 – 94(2014) Test Method for Open-Channel Measurement of Time of Travel Using Dye Tracers
D5614 – 94(2014) Test Method for Open Channel Flow Measurement of Water with Broad-Crested Weirs
D5615 – 20 Test Method for Operating Characteristics of Home Reverse Osmosis Devices
D5616 – 04(2016) Specification for Reclaimed Trichloroethylene
D5617 – 04(2015) Test Method for Multi-Axial Tension Test for Geosynthetics
D5618 – 20 Test Method for Measurement of Barnacle Adhesion Strength in Shear
D5621 – 20 Test Method for Sonic Shear Stability of Hydraulic Fluids
D5622 – 17 Test Methods for Determination of Total Oxygen in Gasoline and Methanol Fuels by Reductive Pyrolysis
D5623 – 19 Test Method for Sulfur Compounds in Light Petroleum Liquids by Gas Chromatography and Sulfur Selective Detection
D5624 – 13 Practice for Determining the Transverse-Aggregate Spread Rate for Surface Treatment Applications
D5627 – 17 Test Method for Water Extractable Residue from Particulate Ion-Exchange Resins
D5628 – 18 Test Method for Impact Resistance of Flat, Rigid Plastic Specimens by Means of a Falling Dart (Tup or Falling Mass)
D5629 – 16 Test Method for Polyurethane Raw Materials: Determination of Acidity in Low-Acidity Aromatic Isocyanates and Polyurethane Prepolymers
D5630 – 13 Test Method for Ash Content in Plastics
D5631 – 15 Practice for Handling, Transportation, and Storage of Halon 1301, Bromotrifluoromethane (CF3Br)
D5632/D5632M – 17 Specification for Halon 1301, Bromotrifluoromethane (CF3Br)
D5633 – 04(2016) Practice for Sampling with a Scoop
D5635/D5635M – 18 Test Method for Dynamic Puncture Resistance of Roofing Membrane Specimens
D5636/D5636M – 94(2017) Test Method for Low Temperature Unrolling of Felt or Sheet Roofing and Waterproofing Materials
D5637 – 05(2017) Test Method for Moisture Resistance of Electrical Insulating Varnishes
D5638 – 18 Test Method for Chemical Resistance of Electrical Insulating Varnishes
D5639/D5639M – 20 Practice for Selection of Corrugated Fiberboard Materials and Box Construction Based on Performance Requirements
D5640 – 95(2014) Guide for Selection of Weirs and Flumes for Open-Channel Flow Measurement of Water
D5641/D5641M – 16 Practice for Geomembrane Seam Evaluation by Vacuum Chamber
D5642 – 16 Test Method for Sealed Tube Chemical Compatibility Test
D5643/D5643M – 06(2018) Specification for Coal Tar Roof Cement, Asbestos Free
D5644 – 18 Test Method for Rubber Compounding Materials—Determination of Particle Size Distribution of Recycled Vulcanizate Particulate Rubber
D5646 – 13(2018) Terminology Relating to Seams and Stitches Used in Home Sewing
D5647 – 07(2018) Guide for Measuring Hairiness of Yarns by the Photo-Electric Apparatus
D5648 – 01(2019) Test Method for Torque-Tension Relationship of Adhesives Used on Threaded Fasteners (Lubricity)
D5649 – 15 Test Method for Torque Strength of Adhesives Used on Threaded Fasteners
D5651 – 13 Test Method for Surface Bond Strength of Wood-Base Fiber and Particle Panel Materials
D5652 – 15 Test Methods for Single-Bolt Connections in Wood and Wood-Based Products
D5656 – 10(2017) Test Method for Thick-Adherend Metal Lap-Shear Joints for Determination of the Stress-Strain Behavior of Adhesives in Shear by Tension Loading
D5657 – 07(2014) Test Method for Fluid Tightness Ability of Adhesives Used on Threaded Fasteners
D5658 – 20 Practice for Sampling Unconsolidated Waste from Trucks
D5662 – 19a Test Method for Determining Automotive Gear Oil Compatibility with Typical Oil Seal Elastomers
D5663 – 15(2020) Guide for Validating Recycled Content in Packaging Paper and Paperboard
D5664 – 17 Test Method for Evaluating the Effects of Fire-Retardant Treatments and Elevated Temperatures on Strength Properties of Fire-Retardant Treated Lumber
D5665/D5665M – 99a(2014)e1 Specification for Thermoplastic Fabrics Used in Cold-Applied Roofing and Waterproofing
D5666 – 95(2019) Test Method for Rubber Chemical Antidegradants—Purity of p-Phenylenediamine (PPD) Antidegradants by High Performance Liquid Chromatography
D5667 – 95(2019) Test Method for Rubber From Synthetic Sources—Total and Water Soluble Ash
D5668 – 19 Test Methods for Rubber From Synthetic Sources—Volatile Matter
D5670 – 95(2019) Test Method for Rubber—Determination of Residual Unsaturation in Hydrogenated Nitrile Rubber (HNBR) by Infrared Spectrophotometry
D5671 – 20 Practice for Polishing and Etching Coal Samples for Microscopical Analysis by Reflected Light
D5672/D5672M – 15 Test Method for Testing Flexible Cellular Materials Measurement of Indentation Force Deflection Using a 25-mm [1-in.] Deflection Technique
D5673 – 16 Test Method for Elements in Water by Inductively Coupled Plasma—Mass Spectrometry
D5674 – 95(2014) Guide for Operation of a Gaging Station
D5675 – 13(2018) Classification for Low Molecular Weight PTFE and FEP Micronized Powders
D5677 – 17 Specification for Fiberglass (Glass-Fiber-Reinforced Thermosetting-Resin) Pipe and Pipe Fittings, Adhesive Bonded Joint Type, for Aviation Jet Turbine Fuel Lines
D5678 – 17 Test Method for Freeze/Thaw Resistance of Wax Emulsion Floor Polish
D5679 – 16 Practice for Sampling Consolidated Solids in Drums or Similar Containers
D5680 – 14 Practice for Sampling Unconsolidated Solids in Drums or Similar Containers
D5681 – 20 Terminology for Waste and Waste Management
D5682 – 18 Test Methods for Electrical Resistivity of Liquid Paint and Related Materials
D5683/D5683M – 95(2017) Test Method for Flexibility of Roofing and Waterproofing Materials and Membranes
D5684 – 19a Terminology Relating to Pile Floor Coverings
D5685 – 19 Specification for “Fiberglass” (Glass-Fiber-Reinforced Thermosetting-Resin) Pressure Pipe Fittings
D5687/D5687M – 20 Guide for Preparation of Flat Composite Panels with Processing Guidelines for Specimen Preparation

D5701–D5800
D5702 – 18 Practice for Field Sampling of Coating Films for Analysis for Heavy Metals
D5703 – 95(2013) Practice for Preparatory Surface Cleaning for Clay Brick Masonry
D5704 – 20 Test Method for Evaluation of the Thermal and Oxidative Stability of Lubricating Oils Used for Manual Transmissions and Final Drive Axles
D5705 – 20 Test Method for Measurement of Hydrogen Sulfide in the Vapor Phase Above Residual Fuel Oils
D5706 – 16 Test Method for Determining Extreme Pressure Properties of Lubricating Greases Using a High-Frequency, Linear-Oscillation (SRV) Test Machine
D5707 – 19 Test Method for Measuring Friction and Wear Properties of Lubricating Grease Using a High-Frequency, Linear-Oscillation (SRV) Test Machine
D5708 – 15(2020)e1 Test Methods for Determination of Nickel, Vanadium, and Iron in Crude Oils and Residual Fuels by Inductively Coupled Plasma (ICP) Atomic Emission Spectrometry
D5709 – 09(2015) Test Method for Sieve Analysis of Petroleum Coke
D5710/D5710M – 15 Specification for Trinidad Lake Modified Asphalt
D5712 – 15(2020) Test Method for Analysis of Aqueous Extractable Protein in Latex, Natural Rubber, and Elastomeric Products Using the Modified Lowry Method
D5713 – 14(2018)e1 Test Method for Analysis of High Purity Benzene for Cyclohexane Feedstock by Capillary Gas Chromatography
D5715 – 14 Practice for Estimating the Degree of Humification of Peat and Other Organic Soils (Visual/Manual Method)
D5716/D5716M – 20 Test Method for Measuring the Rate of Well Discharge by Circular Orifice Weir
D5718 – 13 Guide for Documenting a Groundwater Flow Model Application
D5719 – 13 Guide for Simulation of Subsurface Airflow Using Groundwater Flow Modeling Codes
D5721 – 08(2018) Practice for Air-Oven Aging of Polyolefin Geomembranes
D5722 – 20 Practice for Performing Accelerated Outdoor Weathering of Factory-Coated Embossed Hardboard Using Concentrated Natural Sunlight and a Soak-Freeze-Thaw Procedure
D5723 – 95(2019) Practice for Determination of Chromium Treatment Weight on Metal Substrates by X-Ray Fluorescence
D5724 – 16 Specification for Gouache Paints
D5726 – 98(2020) Specification for Thermoplastic Fabrics Used in Hot-Applied Roofing and Waterproofing
D5727/D5727M – 00(2017) Specification for Emulsified Refined Coal Tar (Mineral Colloid Type)
D5728 – 12(2020) Practices for Securement of Cargo in Intermodal and Unimodal Surface Transport
D5731 – 16 Test Method for Determination of the Point Load Strength Index of Rock and Application to Rock Strength Classifications
D5737/D5737M – 19 Guide for Methods for Measuring Well Discharge
D5739 – 06(2020) Practice for Oil Spill Source Identification by Gas Chromatography and Positive Ion Electron Impact Low Resolution Mass Spectrometry
D5740 – 18 Guide for Writing Material Standards in the Classification Format
D5741 – 96(2017) Practice for Characterizing Surface Wind Using a Wind Vane and Rotating Anemometer
D5742 – 16 Test Method for Determination of Butane Activity of Activated Carbon
D5743 – 97(2013) Practice for Sampling Single or Multilayered Liquids, With or Without Solids, in Drums or Similar Containers
D5744 – 18 Test Method for Laboratory Weathering of Solid Materials Using a Humidity Cell
D5745 – 15 Guide for Developing and Implementing Short-Term Measures or Early Actions for Site Remediation
D5746 – 98(2016) Classification of Environmental Condition of Property Area Types for Defense Base Closure and Realignment Facilities
D5747/D5747M – 20 Practice for Tests to Evaluate the Chemical Resistance of Geomembranes to Liquids
D5748 – 95(2019) Test Method for Protrusion Puncture Resistance of Stretch Wrap Film
D5749 – 17 Specification for Reinforced and Plain Gummed Tape for Sealing and Securing
D5750/D5750M – 95(2020) Guide for Width and Length of Pressure-Sensitive Tape
D5751 – 99(2019) Specification for Adhesives Used for Laminate Joints in Nonstructural Lumber Products
D5752 – 10(2017) Specification for Supplemental Coolant Additives (SCAs) for Use in Precharging Coolants for Heavy-Duty Engines
D5753 – 18 Guide for Planning and Conducting Geotechnical Borehole Geophysical Logging
D5755 – 09(2014)e1 Test Method for Microvacuum Sampling and Indirect Analysis of Dust by Transmission Electron Microscopy for Asbestos Structure Number Surface Loading
D5757 – 11(2017) Test Method for Determination of Attrition of FCC Catalysts by Air Jets
D5758 – 01(2015) Test Method for Determination of Relative Crystallinity of Zeolite ZSM-5 by X-Ray Diffraction
D5759 – 12(2020) Guide for Characterization of Coal Fly Ash and Clean Coal Combustion Fly Ash for Potential Uses
D5760 – 19 Specification for Performance of Manual Transmission Gear Lubricants
D5761 – 96(2017) Practice for Emulsification/Suspension of Multiphase Fluid Waste Materials
D5762 – 18a Test Method for Nitrogen in Liquid Hydrocarbons, Petroleum and Petroleum Products by Boat-Inlet Chemiluminescence
D5763 – 11(2016) Test Method for Oxidation and Thermal Stability Characteristics of Gear Oils Using Universal Glassware
D5764 – 97a(2018) Test Method for Evaluating Dowel-Bearing Strength of Wood and Wood-Based Products
D5765 – 16 Practice for Solvent Extraction of Total Petroleum Hydrocarbons from Soils and Sediments Using Closed Vessel Microwave Heating
D5766/D5766M – 11(2018) Test Method for Open-Hole Tensile Strength of Polymer Matrix Composite Laminates
D5767 – 18 Test Method for Instrumental Measurement of Distinctness-of-Image (DOI) Gloss of Coated Surfaces
D5768 – 02(2018) Test Method for Determination of Iodine Value of Tall Oil Fatty Acids
D5769 – 20 Test Method for Determination of Benzene, Toluene, and Total Aromatics in Finished Gasolines by Gas Chromatography/Mass Spectrometry
D5770 – 11(2017) Test Method for Semiquantitative Micro Determination of Acid Number of Lubricating Oils During Oxidation Testing
D5771 – 20 Test Method for Cloud Point of Petroleum Products and Liquid Fuels (Optical Detection Stepped Cooling Method)
D5772 – 20 Test Method for Cloud Point of Petroleum Products and Liquid Fuels (Linear Cooling Rate Method)
D5773 – 20 Test Method for Cloud Point of Petroleum Products and Liquid Fuels (Constant Cooling Rate Method)
D5774 – 95(2019) Test Methods for Rubber—Chemical Analysis of Extractables
D5775 – 95(2019) Test Method for Rubber—Determination of Bound Styrene in Styrene Butadiene Rubber by Refractive Index
D5776 – 14a Test Method for Bromine Index of Aromatic Hydrocarbons by Electrometric Titration
D5777 – 18 Guide for Using the Seismic Refraction Method for Subsurface Investigation
D5778 – 20 Test Method for Electronic Friction Cone and Piezocone Penetration Testing of Soils
D5779/D5779M – 14 Test Method for Field Determination of Rapid Specific Gravity of Rock and Manmade Materials for Erosion Control
D5780 – 18 Test Methods for Individual Piles in Permafrost Under Static Axial Compressive Load
D5781/D5781M – 18 Guide for Use of Dual-Wall Reverse-Circulation Drilling for Geoenvironmental Exploration and the Installation of Subsurface Water Quality Monitoring Devices
D5782 – 18 Guide for Use of Direct Air-Rotary Drilling for Geoenvironmental Exploration and the Installation of Subsurface Water-Quality Monitoring Devices
D5783 – 18 Guide for Use of Direct Rotary Drilling with Water-Based Drilling Fluid for Geoenvironmental Exploration and the Installation of Subsurface Water-Quality Monitoring Devices
D5784/D5784M – 18 Guide for Use of Hollow-Stem Augers for Geoenvironmental Exploration and the Installation of Subsurface Water Quality Monitoring Devices
D5785/D5785M – 20 Practice for (Analytical Procedure) for Determining Transmissivity of Confined Nonleaky Aquifers by Underdamped Well Response to Instantaneous Change in Head (Slug Test)
D5786 – 17 Practice for (Field Procedure) for Constant Drawdown Tests in Flowing Wells for Determining Hydraulic Properties of Aquifer Systems
D5787 – 20 Practice for Monitoring Well Protection At or Near Land Surface
D5788 – 95(2017) Guide for Spiking Organics into Aqueous Samples
D5790 – 18 Test Method for Measurement of Purgeable Organic Compounds in Water by Capillary Column Gas Chromatography/Mass Spectrometry
D5791 – 95(2017) Guide for Using Probability Sampling Methods in Studies of Indoor Air Quality in Buildings
D5792 – 10(2015) Practice for Generation of Environmental Data Related to Waste Management Activities: Development of Data Quality Objectives
D5793 – 18 Test Method for Binding Sites per Unit Length or Width of Pile Yarn Floor Coverings
D5794 – 95(2014) Guide for Determination of Anions in Cathodic Electrocoat Permeates by Ion Chromatography
D5795 – 16 Test Method for Determination of Liquid Water Absorption of Coated Wood and Wood Based Products Via “Cobb Ring” Apparatus
D5796 – 20 Test Method for Measurement of Dry Film Thickness of Thin-Film Coil-Coated Systems by Destructive Means Using a Boring Device
D5797 – 18 Specification for Methanol Fuel Blends (M51–M85) for Methanol-Capable Automotive Spark-Ignition Engines
D5798 – 20 Specification for Ethanol Fuel Blends for Flexible-Fuel Automotive Spark-Ignition Engines
D5799 – 19 Test Method for Determination of Peroxides in Butadiene
D5800 – 20 Test Method for Evaporation Loss of Lubricating Oils by the Noack Method

D5801–D5900
D5801 – 17 Test Method for Toughness and Tenacity of Asphalt Materials
D5805 – 00(2019) Test Methods for Rubber—Determination of Carbon Black in Masterbatches
D5806 – 95(2017) Test Method for Disinfectant Quaternary Ammonium Salts by Potentiometric Titration
D5807 – 18 Practice for Evaluating the Overpressurization Characteristics of Inflatable Restraint Cushions
D5808 – 20 Test Method for Determining Chloride in Aromatic Hydrocarbons and Related Chemicals by Microcoulometry
D5810 – 96(2015) Guide for Spiking into Aqueous Samples 
D5811 – 20 Test Method for Strontium-90 in Water
D5813 – 04(2018) Specification for Cured-In-Place Thermosetting Resin Sewer Piping Systems
D5814 – 18 Practice for Determination of Contamination in Recycled Poly(Ethylene Terephthalate) (PET) Flakes and Chips Using a Plaque Test
D5817 – 20 Practice for Carbon Black, Pelleted—Reduction, Blending, and Drying of Gross Samples for Testing
D5818 – 11(2018) Practice for Exposure and Retrieval of Samples to Evaluate Installation Damage of Geosynthetics
D5819 – 18 Guide for Selecting Test Methods for Experimental Evaluation of Geosynthetic Durability
D5820 – 95(2018) Practice for Pressurized Air Channel Evaluation of Dual-Seamed Geomembranes
D5821 – 13(2017) Test Method for Determining the Percentage of Fractured Particles in Coarse Aggregate
D5822 – 13(2019) Test Method for Determining Seam Strength in Inflatable Restraint Cushions
D5823 – 19 Test Method for Tuft Height of Pile Floor Coverings
D5824 – 98(2017) Test Method for Determining Resistance to Delamination of Adhesive Bonds in Overlay-Wood Core Laminates Exposed to Heat and Water
D5827 – 09(2015) Test Method for Analysis of Engine Coolant for Chloride and Other Anions by Ion Chromatography
D5828 – 97(2018) Test Method for Compatibility of Supplemental Coolant Additives (SCAs) and Engine Coolant Concentrates
D5830 – 14 Test Method for Solvents Analysis in Hazardous Waste Using Gas Chromatography
D5831 – 17 Practice for Screening Fuels in Soils
D5832 – 98(2014) Test Method for Volatile Matter Content of Activated Carbon Samples
D5833 – 12(2020) Guide for Source Reduction Reuse, Recycling, or Disposal of Steel Cans
D5835 – 20 Practice for Sampling Stationary Source Emissions for the Automated Determination of Gas Concentrations
D5836 – 20 Test Method for Determination of 2,4-Toluene Diisocyanate (2,4-TDI) and 2,6-Toluene Diisocyanate (2,6-TDI) in Workplace Atmospheres (1–2 PP Method)
D5837 – 15 Test Method for Furanic Compounds in Electrical Insulating Liquids by High-Performance Liquid Chromatography (HPLC)
D5839 – 15 Test Method for Trace Element Analysis of Hazardous Waste Fuel by Energy-Dispersive X-Ray Fluorescence Spectrometry
D5842 – 19 Practice for Sampling and Handling of Fuels for Volatility Measurement
D5843/D5843M – 95(2014)e1 Guide for Application of Fully Adhered Vulcanized Rubber Sheets Used in Waterproofing
D5845 – 01(2016) Test Method for Determination of MTBE, ETBE, TAME, DIPE, Methanol, Ethanol and tert-Butanol in Gasoline by Infrared Spectroscopy
D5846 – 07(2017) Test Method for Universal Oxidation Test for Hydraulic and Turbine Oils Using the Universal Oxidation Test Apparatus
D5847 – 02(2020) Practice for Writing Quality Control Specifications for Standard Test Methods for Water Analysis
D5848 – 20 Test Method for Mass Per Unit Area of Pile Yarn Floor Coverings
D5849/D5849M – 21 Test Method for Evaluating Resistance of Modified Bituminous Roofing Membrane to Cyclic Fatigue (Joint Displacement)
D5850 – 20 Practice for (Analytical Procedure) Determining Transmissivity, Storage Coefficient, and Anisotropy Ratio from a Network of Partially Penetrating Wells
D5851 – 95(2015) Guide for Planning and Implementing a Water Monitoring Program
D5853 – 17a Test Method for Pour Point of Crude Oils
D5854 – 19a Practice for Mixing and Handling of Liquid Samples of Petroleum and Petroleum Products
D5855/D5855M – 20 Practice for (Analytical Procedure) Determining Transmissivity and Storage Coefficient of Confined Nonleaky or Leaky Aquifer by Constant Drawdown Method in Flowing Well
D5856 – 15 Test Method for Measurement of Hydraulic Conductivity of Porous Material Using a Rigid-Wall, Compaction-Mold Permeameter
D5857 – 17 Specification for Polypropylene Injection and Extrusion Materials Using ISO Protocol and Methodology
D5858 – 96(2020) Guide for Calculating In Situ Equivalent Elastic Moduli of Pavement Materials Using Layered Elastic Theory
D5860 – 95(2013) Test Method for Evaluation of the Effect of Water Repellent Treatments on Freeze-Thaw Resistance of Hydraulic Cement Mortar Specimens
D5861 – 07(2017) Guide for Significance of Particle Size Measurements of Coating Powders
D5863 – 00a(2016) Test Methods for Determination of Nickel, Vanadium, Iron, and Sodium in Crude Oils and Residual Fuels by Flame Atomic Absorption Spectrometry
D5864 – 18 Test Method for Determining Aerobic Aquatic Biodegradation of Lubricants or Their Components
D5865/D5865M – 19 Test Method for Gross Calorific Value of Coal and Coke
D5866 – 12(2020) Test Method for Neps in Cotton Fibers
D5867 – 12(2020) Test Methods for Measurement of Physical Properties of Raw Cotton by Cotton Classification Instruments
D5868 – 01(2014) Test Method for Lap Shear Adhesion for Fiber Reinforced Plastic (FRP) Bonding
D5869/D5869M – 07A(2018)e1 Practice for Dark Oven Heat Exposure of Roofing and Waterproofing Materials
D5870 – 16 Practice for Calculating Property Retention Index of Plastics
D5871 – 19 Specification for Benzene for Cyclohexane Feedstock
D5872/D5872M – 18 Guide for Use of Casing Advancement Drilling Methods for Geoenvironmental Exploration and Installation of Subsurface Water Quality Monitoring Devices
D5873 – 14 Test Method for Determination of Rock Hardness by Rebound Hammer Method
D5874 – 16 Test Methods for Determination of the Impact Value (IV) of a Soil
D5875/D5875M – 18 Guide for Use of Cable-Tool Drilling and Sampling Methods for Geoenvironmental Exploration and Installation of Subsurface Water Quality Monitoring Devices
D5876/D5876M – 17 Guide for Use of Direct Rotary Wireline Casing Advancement Drilling Methods for Geoenvironmental Exploration and Installation of Subsurface Water-Quality Monitoring Devices
D5878 – 19 Guides for Using Rock-Mass Classification Systems for Engineering Purposes
D5879/D5879M – 18 Practice for Surface Site Characterization for On-Site Septic Systems
D5881 – 20 Practice for (Analytical Procedures) Determining Transmissivity of Confined Nonleaky Aquifers by Critically Damped Well Response to Instantaneous Change in Head (Slug)
D5882 – 16 Test Method for Low Strain Impact Integrity Testing of Deep Foundations
D5883 – 18 Guide for Use of Rotary Kiln Produced Expanded Shale, Clay or Slate (ESCS) as a Mineral Amendment in Topsoil Used for Landscaping and Related Purposes
D5884/D5884M – 04A(2015)e1 Test Method for Determining Tearing Strength of Internally Reinforced Geomembranes
D5885/D5885M – 20 Test Method for Oxidative Induction Time of Polyolefin Geosynthetics by High-Pressure Differential Scanning Calorimetry
D5886 – 95(2018) Guide for Selection of Test Methods to Determine Rate of Fluid Permeation Through Geomembranes for Specific Applications
D5887/D5887M – 20 Test Method for Measurement of Index Flux Through Saturated Geosynthetic Clay Liner Specimens Using a Flexible Wall Permeameter
D5888 – 19 Guide for Storage and Handling of Geosynthetic Clay Liners
D5889/D5889M – 18 Practice for Quality Control of Geosynthetic Clay Liners
D5890 – 19 Test Method for Swell Index of Clay Mineral Component of Geosynthetic Clay Liners
D5891/D5891M – 19 Test Method for Fluid Loss of Clay Component of Geosynthetic Clay Liners
D5893/D5893M – 16 Specification for Cold Applied, Single Component, Chemically Curing Silicone Joint Sealant for Portland Cement Concrete Pavements
D5894 – 16 Practice for Cyclic Salt Fog/UV Exposure of Painted Metal, (Alternating Exposures in a Fog/Dry Cabinet and a UV/Condensation Cabinet)
D5895 – 20 Test Methods for Evaluating Drying or Curing During Film Formation of Organic Coatings Using Mechanical Recorders
D5896 – 96(2019)e1 Test Method for Carbohydrate Distribution of Cellulosic Materials
D5897 – 13 Test Method for Determination of Percent Hydroxyl on Cellulose Esters by Potentiometric Titration—Alternative Method
D5898/D5898M – 96(2013) Guide for Standard Details for Adhered Sheet Waterproofing
D5899 – 98(2019) Classification System for Rubber Compounding Materials for Use in Computer Material Management Systems
D5900 – 20 Specification for Physical and Chemical Properties of Industry Reference Materials (IRM)

D5901–D6000
D5902 – 05(2019) Test Method for Rubber—Determination of Residual Unsaturation in Hydrogenated Nitrile Rubber (HNBR) by Iodine Value
D5903 – 96(2017)e1 Guide for Planning and Preparing for a Groundwater Sampling Event
D5904 – 02(2017) Test Method for Total Carbon, Inorganic Carbon, and Organic Carbon in Water by Ultraviolet, Persulfate Oxidation, and Membrane Conductivity Detection
D5905 – 98(2018) Practice for the Preparation of Substitute Wastewater
D5906 – 02(2013) Guide for Measuring Horizontal Positioning During Measurements of Surface Water Depths
D5907 – 18 Test Methods for Filterable Matter (Total Dissolved Solids) and Nonfilterable Matter (Total Suspended Solids) in Water
D5909 – 20 Test Method for Drying Time of Oxidative-Drying Printing Inks by Squalene Resistance
D5910 – 05(2019) Test Method for Determination of Free Formaldehyde in Emulsion Polymers by Liquid Chromatography
D5912 – 20 Practice for (Analytical Procedure) Determining Hydraulic Conductivity of an Unconfined Aquifer by Overdamped Well Response to Instantaneous Change in Head (Slug)
D5913 – 96(2019) Test Method for Evaluation of Cleanability of Paint Brushes
D5917 – 15(2019) Test Method for Trace Impurities in Monocyclic Aromatic Hydrocarbons by Gas Chromatography and External Calibration
D5918 – 13e1 Test Methods for Frost Heave and Thaw Weakening Susceptibility of Soils
D5919 – 96(2017) Practice for Determination of Adsorptive Capacity of Activated Carbon by a Micro-Isotherm Technique for Adsorbates at ppb Concentrations
D5920/D5920M – 20 Practice for (Analytical Procedure) Tests of Anisotropic Unconfined Aquifers by Neuman Method
D5922 – 18 Guide for Analysis, Interpretation, and Modeling of Spatial Variation in Geostatistical Site Investigations
D5923 – 18 Guide for Selection of Kriging Methods in Geostatistical Site Investigations
D5924 – 18 Guide for Selection of Simulation Approaches in Geostatistical Site Investigations
D5926 – 15(2020) Specification for Poly (Vinyl Chloride) (PVC) Gaskets for Drain, Waste, and Vent (DWV), Sewer, Sanitary, and Storm Plumbing Systems
D5927 – 17 Classification System for and Basis for Specifications for Thermoplastic Polyester (TPES) Injection and Extrusion Materials Based on ISO Test Methods
D5928 – 18a Practice for Screening of Waste for Radioactivity
D5929 – 18 Test Method for Determining Biodegradability of Materials Exposed to Source-Separated Organic Municipal Solid Waste Mesophilic Composting Conditions by Respirometry
D5930 – 17 Test Method for Thermal Conductivity of Plastics by Means of a Transient Line-Source Technique
D5931 – 20 Test Method for Density and Relative Density of Engine Coolant Concentrates and Aqueous Engine Coolants by Digital Density Meter
D5932 – 20 Test Method for Determination of 2,4-Toluene Diisocyanate (2,4-TDI) and 2,6-Toluene Diisocyanate (2,6-TDI) in Air (with 9-(N-Methylaminomethyl) Anthracene Method) (MAMA) in the Workplace
D5933 – 19 Specification for 258-in. and 4-in. Diameter Metal Shear Plates for Use in Wood Constructions
D5946 – 17 Test Method for Corona-Treated Polymer Films Using Water Contact Angle Measurements
D5947 – 18 Test Methods for Physical Dimensions of Solid Plastics Specimens
D5948 – 05(2020) Specification for Molding Compounds, Thermosetting
D5949 – 16 Test Method for Pour Point of Petroleum Products (Automatic Pressure Pulsing Method)
D5950 – 14(2020) Test Method for Pour Point of Petroleum Products (Automatic Tilt Method)
D5952 – 08(2015) Guide for the Inspection of Water Systems for Legionella and the Investigation of Possible Outbreaks of Legionellosis (Legionnaires' Disease or Pontiac Fever)
D5953M – 16 Test Method for Determination of Non-methane Organic Compounds (NMOC) in Ambient Air Using Cryogenic Preconcentration and Direct Flame Ionization Detection
D5954 – 98(2014)e1 Test Method for Mercury Sampling and Measurement in Natural Gas by Atomic Absorption Spectroscopy
D5955 – 02(2017)e1 Test Methods for Estimating Contribution of Environmental Tobacco Smoke to Respirable Suspended Particles Based on UVPM and FPM
D5956 – 15 Guide for Sampling Strategies for Heterogeneous Wastes
D5957 – 98(2013) Guide for Flood Testing Horizontal Waterproofing Installations
D5958 – 99(2020) Practices for Preparation of Oil-Based Ink Resin Solutions
D5959 – 12(2017) Test Method for Bulk Density of Level Paintbrush Filaments
D5960 – 03(2018) Specification for Technical Grade Ethylene Dichloride
D5961/D5961M – 17 Test Method for Bearing Response of Polymer Matrix Composite Laminates
D5963 – 04(2019) Test Method for Rubber Property—Abrasion Resistance (Rotary Drum Abrader)
D5964 – 16 Practice for Rubber IRM 901, IRM 902, and IRM 903 Replacement Oils for ASTM No. 1, ASTM No. 2, ASTM No. 3 Oils, and IRM 905 formerly ASTM No. 5 Oil
D5965 – 19 Test Methods for Density of Coating Powders
D5966 – 13 Test Method for Evaluation of Engine Oils for Roller Follower Wear in Light-Duty Diesel Engine
D5967 – 19 Test Method for Evaluation of Diesel Engine Oils in T-8 Diesel Engine
D5968 – 19a Test Method for Evaluation of Corrosiveness of Diesel Engine Oil at 121 °C
D5969 – 11(2016) Test Method for Corrosion-Preventive Properties of Lubricating Greases in Presence of Dilute Synthetic Sea Water Environments
D5970/D5970M – 16 Test Method for Deterioration of Geotextiles from Outdoor Exposure
D5971/D5971M – 16 Practice for Sampling Freshly Mixed Controlled Low-Strength Material
D5972 – 16 Test Method for Freezing Point of Aviation Fuels (Automatic Phase Transition Method)
D5973 – 97(2017) Specification for Elastomeric Strip Seals with Steel Locking Edge Rails Used in Expansion Joint Sealing
D5974 – 20 Test Methods for Fatty and Rosin Acids in Tall Oil Fractionation Products by Capillary Gas Chromatography
D5975 – 17 Test Method for Determining the Stability of Compost by Measuring Oxygen Consumption
D5977 – 15 Specification for High Load Rotational Spherical Bearings for Bridges and Structures
D5978/D5978M – 16 Guide for Maintenance and Rehabilitation of Groundwater Monitoring Wells
D5979 – 96(2019)e1 Guide for Conceptualization and Characterization of Groundwater Systems
D5980 – 16 Guide for Selection and Documentation of Existing Wells for Use in Environmental Site Characterization and Monitoring
D5981/D5981M – 18 Guide for Calibrating a Groundwater Flow Model Application
D5982 – 15 Test Method for Determining Cement Content of Fresh Soil-Cement (Heat of Neutralization Method)
D5983 – 18 Specification for Methyl Tertiary-Butyl Ether (MTBE) for Blending With Gasolines for Use as Automotive Spark-Ignition Engine Fuel
D5984 – 11(2017) Test Method for Semi-Quantitative Field Test Method for Base Number in New and Used Lubricants by Color-Indicator Titration
D5985 – 02(2020) Test Method for Pour Point of Petroleum Products (Rotational Method)
D5986 – 96(2019) Test Method for Determination of Oxygenates, Benzene, Toluene, C8–C12 Aromatics and Total Aromatics in Finished Gasoline by Gas Chromatography/Fourier Transform Infrared Spectroscopy
D5988 – 18 Test Method for Determining Aerobic Biodegradation of Plastic Materials in Soil
D5989 – 18 Specification for Extruded and Monomer Cast Shapes Made from Nylon (PA)
D5990 – 20a Classification System and Basis for Polyketone Injection Molding and Extrusion Materials (PK)
D5991 – 17 Practice for Separation and Identification of Poly(Vinyl Chloride) (PVC) Contamination in Poly(Ethylene Terephthalate) (PET) Flake
D5992 – 96(2018) Guide for Dynamic Testing of Vulcanized Rubber and Rubber-Like Materials Using Vibratory Methods
D5993 – 18 Test Method for Measuring Mass per Unit Area of Geosynthetic Clay Liners
D5994/D5994M – 10(2015)e1 Test Method for Measuring Core Thickness of Textured Geomembranes
D5995 – 18 Guide for Environmental Site Investigation in Cold Regions
D5996 – 16 Test Method for Measuring Anionic Contaminants in High-Purity Water by On-Line Ion Chromatography
D5997 – 15 Test Method for On-Line Monitoring of Total Carbon, Inorganic Carbon in Water by Ultraviolet, Persulfate Oxidation, and Membrane Conductivity Detection
D5998 – 16 Specification for Molded Polyethylene Shipping and Storage Drums
D6000/D6000M – 15e1 Guide for Presentation of Water-Level Information from Groundwater Sites

See also
 International Classification for Standards
 List of ISO standards
 List of EN standards
 List of IEC standards

References

External links
ASTM Standards site 
List of D ASTM standards

 D5001
ASTM D5001
Materials testing
Pavement engineering